The Ksi Sii Aks (formerly Tseax River) is a tributary of the Nass River in northwestern British Columbia, Canada. It is most notable as the namesake of Tseax Cone, a volcano within its basin that was responsible for an eruption in the 17th century that killed 2,000 Nisga'a people. Prior to the eruption, the Nisga'a name for this river was Ksi Gimwits'ax. Buried by the eruption, it eventually resurfaced. The Nisga'a recognized it as the same stream but renamed it Ksi Sii Aks:  means "new body of water".

As prescribed by terms of the Nisga'a Treaty, the Tseax River is now officially named the Ksi Sii Aks.

From its source near Sand Lake the river flows through Sand Lake, Gainor Lake, and Lava Lake. It collects many tributary streams, the largest of which are Poupard Creek, May Creek, Alder Creek, Crater Creek, Auk Creek, and Gitzyon Creek.

References

Nass Country
Rivers of British Columbia
Cassiar Land District